ZNJY-FM is a Gospel music radio station in Nassau, Bahamas.

External links 
  (offline)

Radio stations in the Bahamas
Christian radio stations in North America
Radio stations established in 1999
1999 establishments in the Bahamas